The Autumn Offering is the fifth and final studio album by American metal band The Autumn Offering. The album was released on August 31, 2010 through Victory Records. The Autumn Offering is the first release from the band to feature former Scum of the Earth and Silent Civilian guitarist Jesse Nunn, and bassist Carl Bensley.

On July 20, 2010 The Autumn Offering uploaded the track "Born Dead" to their MySpace. The band also recorded a music video for the track with director Eric Richter.

Track listing

Personnel
Source:
The Autumn Offering
Carl Bensley – bass
Tommy Church – rhythm guitar
Matt McChesney – vocals, art direction
Jesse Nunn – lead guitar, art direction
Brian Sculley – drums

Additional 
Pete Butcho – production, mixing, mastering, engineer, additional guitar
The Autumn Offering – production
Double J – layout
Derek Guidry – illustrations
John Finberg – booking

References

2010 albums
The Autumn Offering albums
Victory Records albums